Robert "Rob" Shaw (born December 6, 1989) is a Canadian wheelchair tennis player who competes in international level events, he plays in the quads' division. He is a Parapan American Games champion in the quads' singles at the 2019 Parapan American Games in Lima. He was partially paralysed from the neck down after a freak diving accident aged 21.

Shaw qualified to represent Canada at the 2020 Summer Paralympics.

References

External links
 

1989 births
Living people
Medalists at the 2019 Parapan American Games
Paralympic wheelchair tennis players of Canada
Sportspeople from Kelowna
Sportspeople from North Bay, Ontario
Canadian male tennis players
Wheelchair tennis players at the 2020 Summer Paralympics